Silurus soldatovi, Soldatov's catfish or northern sheatfish, is a large catfish species from the Far East.

Habitat
Soldatov's catfish lives in Amur River (Ussuri) in Russia and China. It prefers water temperatures from 5 to 25 °C.

Description
This catfish is visually similar to the closely related Wels catfish. Soldatov's catfish has a large flat head. Its mouth is blunt and rounded, the upper jaw shorter than the lower jaw. Barbels are located on the upper jaw and chin. It has the following formula fins: dorsal six soft rays, anal 83–90 soft rays. The fish can live up to 20 years, and can grow to about 4 meters in length and weigh 40 kilograms.

Threats
The Soldatov's catfish population is threatened by overfishing, habitat degradation and water pollution. Due to its localized distribution and the low population density, the population is now considered endangered.

References

External links
 Picture of Silurus soldatovi

Silurus
Fish of East Asia
Freshwater fish of China
Fish of Russia
Taxa named by Georgii Vasil'evich Nikolskii
Taxa named by Sergey Gavrilovich Soin
Fish described in 1948